Venezuelan rock is rock music from Venezuela, the most common being based on Rock en Español.

History
First steps for Rock music in Venezuela started by the oil industry jump in the late 1950s and can be traced to the band "Los Flipper", " The Thunderbirds" and "Los Dangers", where after Rudy Márquez, it would be part with Henry Stephen of "Los Impala", a band from the prominent crude oil city Maracaibo and the first South American group with a high reputation and considerable impact in other continents (pretty much of his career in Spain). In Caracas "Los Holidays" released several albums, and were the first Latin-American rock band to travel and work in Europe (Mostly Spain's Costa Brava, July 1966-October 1966). Los Holidays main vocalist, Wolfgang Vivas went on to a solo career, as did guitarist/vocalist Franklin Holland (Van Splunteren) who later joined the American band "Gary and the Playboys", and created a new and very original "Proyecto Franklin Holland" in Caracas, 1984, releasing several well received albums on the Sonografica label. Then came up bands like "Los Dinámicos", "Los Clippers",  "Los Darts", "Los 007", "Los Supersonicos" and "Los Claners"  who followed the British and French rock patterns. Bands such as  "Los Memphis" of Pablo Manavello y "Los Buitres" de Jorge Spiteri,  "Ladies WC" or "Azúcar, Cacao y Leche" focused on progressive and even the fusion stage of rock.  "Las Cuatro Monedas" introduced in Venezuela the Jamaican rithms as Reggae and Ska.

Subsequently, some bands in the 1970s, such as  "Una Luz", "People Pie", "El Zigui", "La Cuarta Calle", "Témpano" and the progressive rock trio "Ficcion" (Sobre el Abismo). "Ficcion" became emblematic in the Venezuelan Prog Rock scene and is still very active, they released (May 2013) their third album: "Ficcion III-Sobre La Ira de Dios". "Tempano" moved on to a more progressive (Atabal Yemal) and later moving to a new wave sound with the album (Essequibo). Then also came a heavy metal, hard rock movement with "Sacrifice", "Power Age" that later would become "Arkangel" founded by *Paul Gilman and Freddy Marshall, "Uzi", "Spectro" and "Jose Arevalo Rock Band", "Resistencia", "Fahrenheit", "Grand Bite" and "Alta Frecuencia". As for the blues music, while a few artists did occasionally perform some classic blues in English since the late '60's, the first band recording blues music with Spanish lyrics was "Pastel de Gente" that released two albums in the mid 1980s. Some of the most prominent artists in the 1980s were the band "Aditus" and the soloists Melissa and also Jorge Aguilar who mixed rock with pop and other trends, such as the new wave, synth pop and funk respectively, making the genre more digestible to the larger audience. While efforts were mostly oriented to the commercial pop/rock scene, from the underground-punk scene of the 1980s emerged several bands with international promotion, such as "Sentimiento muerto" and "Desorden Público", whose first production was launched in 1987, despite the blockade in the media of some of their music due to their strong political views and mildly offensive language. However, both bands' first recordings achieved a huge success, which led to the record companies change of attitude towards them, both allowing them to record additional records, and opening the doors for other emerging bands of the late 80's, such as "Zapato 3", "Sentimiento Muerto" and "Seguridad Nacional" among others.

In the 1990s, many new bands appeared, such as "Caramelos de Cianuro",  "Malanga", "Los Amigos Invisibles", "Levítico", Candy 66, and "Zapato 3".

The post-90s era was characterized by a lack of significant new rock acts in the Venezuelan music scene, as the musical tastes of former rock-lovers shifted towards EDM.

Recently, the Venezuelan rock scene has been re-energized. Several new bands have emerged trying to push again the Venezuelan rock scene. Bands like "La Vesper", "Viniloversus", "La Vida Bohème", "Los Pixel", "Los Mesoneros", "Telegrama", "The Asbestos", "Americania", "Los Dilbertos", "Los Javelin", "Los Verona (band)",  "Los Paranoias", "Los Daltonicos", "Petrula", "Pentatoniks" and many others have created a vibrant live music scene that threatens to outgrow the limited venues that Caracas has to offer for live music.

Venezuelan rock artists
 La Vesper
 Vytas Brenner
 Los Mesoneros
Paul Gilman
 Franklin Holland (van Splunteren)
 Henry Stephen (musician)
 Caramelos de Cianuro
 Los Amigos Invisibles
 Culto Oculto
 Sacrifice
 Levítico
 Desorden Público
 Los Paranoias
 Los Gusanos
 Verona (band)
 La Vida Boheme
 The Asbestos
 Candy 66
 Freddy Marshall
 Zapato 3
 Sentimiento Muerto

External links and references
 http://rockhechovenezuela.com

Rock music by country

Rock